Rajiv L. Gupta (born December 23, 1945) is an Indian-American businessman, the current chairman of Aptiv, an auto parts company, and a former executive with Rohm and Haas, a manufacturer of specialty chemicals.

Early life 
Gupta was born on December 23, 1945, in Muzaffarnagar, India, the son of Phool Prakash and Rukmini Sahai.

He graduated in 1967 with a degree in mechanical engineering from Indian Institute of Technology Bombay. Gupta continued his studies going on to earn an M.S. degree in Operations Research in 1969 from Cornell University, and his M.B.A. in Finance from the Bennett S. LeBow College of Business at Drexel University in 1972.

Career 
He is the former chairman, CEO, and president of Philadelphia-based Rohm and Haas. In 1971, Gupta joined Rohm and Haas as a financial analyst. Working his way up in the company, Gupta was elected to the board of directors and named vice chairman in January 1999 and later became chairman and chief executive officer in October 1999. He assumed the additional title of president in early 2005. He left Rohm and Haas after its $15.3 billion acquisition by Dow in 2009.

In April 2005, the US Pan Asian American Chamber of Commerce named Gupta as one of the top ten most influential Asian Americans in business. In 2006, Gupta was named Drexel's 53rd Business Leader of the Year. Gupta has also served as the chairman for the American Chemistry Council and the Society of Chemical Industry, America Section.

In 2010, he was chairman of Avantor Performance Material based in Center Valley, Pennsylvania, near Bethlehem.

In February 2015, he became the chairman of Delphi Automotive. Delphi Automotive spun off its powertrain division and aftermarket related businesses (now Delphi Technologies) in December 2017 and changed its name to Aptiv plc.

Personal life 
Gupta married Kamla Varshney in 1968, and they have two children, civil rights attorney Vanita Gupta and Dr. Amita Gupta, Director of Johns Hopkins Medicine's Division of Infectious Diseases.  They live in Newtown Square, Pennsylvania. In 2018, Raj and Kamla Gupta made a gift to the Drexel University LeBow College of Business to establish the Raj & Kamla Gupta Governance Institute.

References

External links 
 Delphi Automotive, Board of Directors

American chemical industry businesspeople
American chief executives of manufacturing companies
Cornell University College of Engineering alumni
Drexel University alumni
Living people
1945 births
IIT Bombay alumni
Indian emigrants to the United States
American people of Indian descent
American chief executives